Sabnova is a rural locality (a selo) in Derbentsky District, Republic of Dagestan, Russia. The population was 3,820 as of 2010. There are 51 streets.

Geography 
Sabnova is located 4 km northwest of Derbent (the district's administrative centre) by road. Derbent is the nearest rural locality.

Nationalities 
Azerbaijanis, Tabasarans and Dargins live there.

References 

Rural localities in Derbentsky District